Bùi Thanh Hiếu (born February 6, 1972) is a Vietnamese human rights activist and blogger under the username "Nguoi Buon Gio." ("Wind Merchant") In 2009 Hieu was detained for ten days by the Vietnamese government for "“abusing democratic freedoms to infringe upon the interests of the State.” As of 2021 he lives in exile in Germany with his son.

Early life 
Bui Thanh Hieu was born in 1972 in a small alley named in the Đồng Xuân Market in Hanoi, in an area, which he called "the street of life, a place containing many elements of Gypsy, Mafia".

Growing up in a dusty street Hieu had a rough life, earning money to live through theft, gambling, and collecting debt for rent.

Blogging career 
In 2005, after noticing corruption in the hospital where his wife gave birth, he came to a realization that it is a persistent problem in society. He started his blog hoping to contribute to bettering the lives of his children and of future generations. His writings have criticized territorial claims within China, as well as Vietnam's handling of land disputes with the Catholic church, and advocated for democracy in Vietnam.

Arrest 
In 2009 Hieu along with two other Vietnamese bloggers were detained by the Vietnamese government for “abusing democratic freedoms to infringe upon the interests of the State.” Hieu distributed shirts which contained the phrase  “Hoang Sa - Truong Sa belong to Vietnam.” Hoang Sa refers to the Paracel Islands and Truong Sa refers to the Spratly Islands.

Exile to Germany 
In 2010 his writings were translated into German and was awarded a full scholarship from the German government in 2013. Hieu was originally supposed to be in Germany for six months to study art. However he would end up staying there for years and continued to write about Vietnamese politics on his wind trader blog and on Facebook. In February 2020 Heiu announced he would stop producing the Wind Trader blog due to harassment of his family in Vietnam. Including his 86 year old mother who at the time was in a Vietnamese hospital. In February 2021 Amnesty International reported that Hieu was targeted with 4 spyware attacks by OceanLotus between February 2018 and December 2019.

Awards 
Hellman-Hammett award-2010

See Also 
Human rights in Vietnam

References 

1972 births
Vietnamese human rights activists
Vietnamese expatriates in Germany
Vietnamese dissidents
Living people